Palmariales is an order of marine algae.  It includes the edible seaweed dulse (Palmaria palmata).

References

Florideophyceae
Red algae orders